Kidwelly Flats Halt railway station served the Royal Ordnance Factory (ROF) and RAF Pembrey at Pembrey,  Carmarthenshire, Wales between 1941 and 1957. It was on the West Wales Line.

History
The station was opened on 6 July 1941 by the Great Western Railway and closed by British Railways in 1957. Lando Platform or Halt station was also located between Kidwelly Flats and Pembrey and Burry Port stations between 1928 and 1964.

Infrastructure
The station had two platforms on a double track section of line. It partly lay beneath the road bridge and nothing now remains of the station. The station had no sidings or freight facilities.

Services
The station was not open to the general public. Mostly workers arriving from the west used the station from where a bus would take them to the ordnance factory.

Routes

See also 
 West Wales lines

References

Disused railway stations in Carmarthenshire
Railway stations in Great Britain opened in 1941
Railway stations in Great Britain closed in 1957
Former Great Western Railway stations